Davronjon Tukhtasunov (born 14 May 1990) is a Tajikistani footballer who plays for FK Khujand. He is a member of the Tajikistan national football team in the 2010 FIFA World Cup qualification campaign. He also joined the 2007 FIFA U-17 World Cup held in South Korea.

Career statistics

Tajik League

Statistics accurate as of match played 23 March 2017

International goals

Honours
Regar-TadAZ
Tajik League (1): 2008
Ravshan Kulob
Tajik League (1): 2013

References

1990 births
Living people
Tajikistani footballers
Tajikistan international footballers
Association football forwards
Tajikistan Higher League players
Tajikistan youth international footballers